Thomas John Lesley Miles (17 November 1905 – 9 October 1961) was an Australian professional athlete/sprinter who won the 1927 Stawell Gift sprint race and 1928 World Champion by defeating then reigning champion, Tim Banner.

Early life
Miles was born in Bundaberg, the son of James Miles (1878-1940) and Grace Merrifield Nicholson (1885-1943). He attended Bundaberg South State School from 1911.

Later life
Miles died after being struck by a car in Brisbane in 1961.

External links 
 Confirmation of the above and photo of Tom Miles is held at the Bundaberg & District Historical Museum  Refer Museum Co-ordinator, Mrs Christine Spence.
 http://www.stawellgift.com/images/stories/documents/stawell%20gift%20winners%20since%201878.xls

Australian male sprinters
1905 births
1961 deaths
Sportspeople from Bundaberg